Piz Mundaun is a mountain of the Lepontine Alps, situated east of Obersaxen in the canton of Graubünden in Switzerland.

In winter the mountain is part of ski area.

References

External links

 Piz Mundaun on Hikr

Mountains of Switzerland
Mountains of Graubünden
Mountains of the Alps
Lepontine Alps
Two-thousanders of Switzerland
Obersaxen Mundaun
Lumnezia